Back Bay is a neighborhood of Boston, Massachusetts.

Back Bay may also refer to:

Places
 Back Bay (Antarctica)
 Back Bay (MBTA station), an MBTA train station in Back Bay, Boston, Massachusetts, U.S.
 Back Bay (Mumbai), India
 Back Bay, New Brunswick, Canada
 Back Bay, a bay of Biloxi, Mississippi, U.S.
 Back Bay Fens, a park that is part of the Emerald Necklace in Boston, Massachusetts, U.S.
 Back Bay National Wildlife Refuge, Virginia
 Back Bay, Newport Beach, California
 Back Bay, Tobago

Other uses
 Back Bay Publishing, a corporation operated by Boston University students